Oxycrepis rectangula is a species of ground beetle in the family Carabidae. It is found in the United States.

References

Pterostichinae
Articles created by Qbugbot
Beetles described in 1878